John Hamilton Bush  (March 20, 1909 – January 24, 1977) was a Canadian abstract painter. A member of Painters Eleven, his paintings are associated with the Color Field movement and Post-painterly Abstraction. Inspired by Henri Matisse and American abstract expressionist painters like Helen Frankenthaler and Morris Louis, Bush encapsulated joyful yet emotional feelings in his vibrant paintings, comparing them to jazz music. Clement Greenberg described him as a "supreme colorist", along with Kenneth Noland in 1984.

Life and early work
Bush was born in Toronto, Ontario, in 1909. As a young man, he attended the Royal Canadian Academy school in Montreal, Quebec, where he studied with Adam Sheriff Scott and Edmond Dyonnet.

In his early stages, Bush was influenced by the work of Charles Comfort and the Group of Seven. He began his professional career as a landscape artist and focused on painting landscapes, influenced by the Group of Seven. He also attended Charles Comfort's weekly life model drawing sessions, hosted in Comfort's studio in Toronto. During the 1940s, he ran a commercial art business and, by night, furthered his studies at the Ontario College of Art. Bush, like other Canadian artists of the time, was sheltered from major European influences. After seeing the work of the American Abstract Expressionists in New York City, Bush's canvases changed dramatically.

Painters Eleven and after
Bush developed his work and approach to abstraction through the 1950s. He was a member of Painters Eleven, an influential group founded by William Ronald in 1954 to promote abstract painting in Canada, and was soon encouraged in his art by the American art critic Clement Greenberg. Critical at first, Greenberg became a mentor to Bush and encouraged him to refine his palette, technique, and approach. He told Bush to seek in his oil painting the thinness and clarity of colour and the simplicity of his works on paper. As a result of Greenberg's guidance, Bush became closely tied to Color Field Painting and Lyrical Abstraction. Bush's work is based on an abstract record of his perception. Rather than expecting the audience to recognize his subject or experience the use of forms in his paintings, he shares the emotion of that experience by slabs and streaks of color. Bush became friends with artists associated with color-field like Jules Olitski, Kenneth Noland and Anthony Caro. As Painters Eleven disbanded in 1960, Bush moved on, and in the end became one of the most successful artists to come from this group.

Jack Bush represented Canada at the 1967 São Paulo Art Biennial, and in 1976 the Art Gallery of Ontario toured a large retrospective of his work. He died in Toronto at the age of 67 on 24 January 1977. In 1979, two years later, the National Film Board of Canada released a one-hour documentary Jack Bush, directed by Murray Battle.

Influences
One of his most important influences was Henri Matisse (1869-1954), a French artist who led the Fauvist movement about 1900 by pursuing expressive color throughout his career.

Bush once said to his peer and friend Kenneth Noland, 
"What I'd really like to do is hit Matisse's ball out of the park." 

and Noland replied, 
"Go ahead, Matisse won't mind at all."

Honors
 Guggenheim Fellowship, 1968
 Royal Canadian Academy of Arts
 Canada Post honored Jack Bush with a Canadian postage stamp and a souvenir sheet released on March 20, 2009. The stamps featured his 1964 painting, Striped Column and his 1977 painting Chopsticks.

Selected exhibitions
 1954: Roberts Gallery, Toronto (Painters Eleven group show)
 1956: Riverside Museum, New York (American Abstract Artists and Painters Eleven group show)
 1964: Post Painterly Abstraction, Los Angeles County Museum of Art
 1967: São Paulo Art Biennial
 1972: Boston Museum of Fine Arts (survey)
 1976: Art Gallery of Ontario, Toronto (major retrospective)
 2014-15: National Gallery of Canada, Ottawa (major retrospective, 130 paintings, drawings, illustrations)

Selected collections 
 National Gallery of Canada, Ottawa
 Art Gallery of Ontario, Toronto
 Montreal Museum of Fine Arts
 Museum of Fine Arts, Boston
 Tate Gallery, London
Boca Raton Museum of Art, Florida

Personal life
Bush's son Terry is a jingle writer, best known for singing and co-writing "Maybe Tomorrow", the theme for The Littlest Hobo.

References

Bibliography and filmography 
  Boyanoski, Christine. Jack Bush: Early Work [exhibition catalogue]. Toronto: Art Gallery of Ontario, 1985.
  Carpenter, Ken. The Heritage of Jack Bush: A Tribute. Oshawa, Ont.: Robert McLaughlin Gallery, 1981.
  Jack Bush, Paintings & Drawings, 1955-1976 [exhibition catalogue]. London: Arts Council of Great Britain, 1980.
  Jack Bush [exhibition catalogue]. Boston: Museum of Fine Arts, 1972.
  Mayer, Marc and Stanners, Sarah. Jack Bush [exhibition catalogue]. Ottawa: National Gallery of Canada, 2014.
  Wilkin, Karen (ed.). Jack Bush. Toronto: McClelland & Stewart, 1984.
  Jack Bush, documentary director Murray Battle, producer Rudy Buttignol (Cinema Productions for the National Film Board of Canada, 1979) 56 minutes.

External links 
 The Canadian Encyclopedia (Jack Bush)
 Jack Bush Paintings: A Catalogue Raisonné

1909 births
1977 deaths
Artists from Toronto
Canadian painters
Modern painters
Abstract painters
Abstract expressionist artists
Members of the Royal Canadian Academy of Arts
Canadian abstract artists
Officers of the Order of Canada